Ibrahim Maaroufi (born 18 January 1989) is a Moroccan former professional footballer who played as a midfielder.

He has represented both Morocco U-23's and Belgium U-21's at international level. In October 2007 Maaroufi declared himself for Morocco rather than Belgium.

Career
Maaroufi started his career with Belgian team Anderlecht before moving to Dutch side PSV Eindhoven.

Internazionale
He was called up to the first team many times by Roberto Mancini, but finally made his first team and Serie A debut against Livorno, 25 October 2006, as a substitute for Dejan Stanković in the 82nd minute, becoming the second youngest player in the history of Inter, older than Goran Slavkovski but younger than Giuseppe Bergomi.

He played his first Italian Cup match as a starter for F.C. Internazionale Milano on 9 November 2006, against F.C. Messina Peloro.  He also played the return leg. In total Maaroufi made 6 appearances for Internazionale with 1 coming in Serie A and 5 appearances coming in the Coppa Italia.

FC Twente loan
At the start of 2008–09 season he was loaned to FC Twente to gain more experience when he was signed by Fred Rutten who had previously coached Maaroufi at PSV. Rutten left the club to join FC Schalke and was replaced by Steve McLaren soon after.

Vicenza
In February 2009, the last day of transfer window, he was sold to Vicenza in joint-ownership bid. He picked up a knee injury which rules him out of some games. However, he was released by Vicenza in mutual consent on 24 August 2009.

AC Bellinzona
On 31 August 2009, Maaroufi agreed a three-year contract with Swiss Super League outfit AC Bellinzona.

MVV Maastricht
In February 2010 Maaroufi agreed to return to the Netherlands, joining Eerste Divisie club MVV Maastricht on a free transfer, only to leave it at the end of the season; both experiences ended with no first team appearances at all.

Wydad Casablanca
On 1 June 2010, Maaroufi signed a two-year contract with Moroccan champions Wydad Casablanca. He was however released later in December, after appearing in just two league games.

Eupen
In January 2011, Belgian Pro League club Eupen announced the signing of Maaroufi on a free transfer. In July 2011 he was released by Eupen, after making just one first team appearance.  Maaroufi then joined Belgian side AS Eupen, playing in the Belgium top flight, however his only appearance came as a second-half substitute in the 1–0 home defeat to Standard Liège in February. He was also an unused substitute on four occasions before being released by Eupen at the end of the season.

Racing Mechelen
In August 2011, he joined Leeds United on trial. He played for Leeds reserves against Farsley Celtic on 6 August.

Parseh Tehran

Paganese
On 27 October 2014, Maaroufi was signed by Italian Lega Pro club Paganese on a free transfer.

Renaissance Schaerbeek
Between 2015 and 2017, Maaroufi played for Renaissance Schaerbeek in the Belgian Provincial 1.

Toulouse Rodéo and trials
In March 2017, Maaroufi joined French club Toulouse Rodéo in the fifth-tier Championnat National 3.

After leaving the club in 2018, he trialled with Dutch Eerste Divisie club FC Eindhoven, without success.

International career
Maaroufi played for both Belgium and Morocco in youth level. He trained with the Morocco Olympics team in December 2006, but made his U-21 team debut for Belgium against Sint-Truiden in February 2007. He was also called up for the match against Serbia in March 2007.

He played his last Belgian U-21 cap against Austria U-21, on 7 September 2007.

Maaroufi said originally he would accept a call up to Morocco Under 23's only if he was made captain. He then accepted call-up from Morocco Olympics team again, for 2008 CAF Men's Pre-Olympic Tournament in October 2007, verse Cameroon. In October 2007 Maaroufi declared himself for Morocco rather than Belgium.

Personal life
In March 2016, it was revealed that Khalid El Bakraoui, one of the suicide bombers of the 2016 Brussels bombings, had used the identity of Maaroufi in order to gain access to Belgium and rent the apartment from which the attacks in Brussels and as well as the November 2015 Paris attacks were planned.

Honours

Club
Inter Milan
Serie A: 2006–07, 2007–08
Supercoppa Italiana: 2005–06

References

External links
 Profile at Internazionale
 Profile at Swiss Football League  
 
 

Moroccan footballers
Belgian footballers
Belgium under-21 international footballers
PSV Eindhoven players
Inter Milan players
FC Twente players
L.R. Vicenza players
AC Bellinzona players
MVV Maastricht players
Wydad AC players
K.A.S. Eupen players
Serie A players
Eredivisie players
Belgian Pro League players
Belgian expatriate footballers
Expatriate footballers in Italy
Expatriate footballers in the Netherlands
Expatriate footballers in Switzerland
Belgian sportspeople of Moroccan descent
Association football midfielders
1989 births
Living people
Footballers from Brussels